Joseph David Kucan is an American video game developer, director, actor, screenwriter, and casting director for various gaming companies and films. He is a resident of Las Vegas, Nevada. He is well known for his role as Kane from the Command & Conquer series.

Career
Kucan started working with Westwood Studios in 1992. He was originally hired to direct the voice talent, but as CD-ROMs became more popular, he began to experiment with recording full motion video.  In the Command & Conquer saga, Kucan portrays the series' most iconic character, Kane, the messianic/prophetic leader of a pseudo-religious mass movement with transhumanist ambitions called The Brotherhood of Nod.

He is also featured in Command & Conquer 3: Tiberium Wars and the subsequent expansion pack Command & Conquer 3: Kane's Wrath for both PC and Xbox 360, where he reprises his role as Kane.  This was the first entry in the series he did not direct.  In 2008, Kucan was inducted into the Guinness World Records Gamer's Edition 2008 as the longest recurring actor in any video game franchise to date for his portrayal of Kane.  He reprised his role once again as Kane in Command & Conquer 4: Tiberian Twilight which marked the conclusion of the Tiberian series and thus the role of Kane. In 2020, the role of Kane was again taken up by Kucan for the remasters of the original Command & Conquer and Red Alert. New trailers, advertisements, and remastered in-game cinematic videos were recorded in HD specifically for the official project released on June 5, 2020.

In 2013, Kucan, along with his partner, Ann-Marie Pereth, and brother, Daniel Kucan, founded A Public Fit Theatre Company based in Las Vegas, NV.

Games
 The Legend of Kyrandia - Book One (1992), Virgin Games (voiced Brandon)
 The Legend of Kyrandia - Book Two: The Hand of Fate (1993), Virgin Games (voiced the narrator, implied to be Brandon)
 Lands of Lore: The Throne of Chaos (1993), Westwood Studios (voiced Nathaniel the Herbalist / Phillip)
 The Legend of Kyrandia - Book Three: Malcolm's Revenge (1994), Virgin Interactive (voiced Brandom)
 Monopoly (1995), Hasbro Interactive
 Command & Conquer (1995), Westwood Studios (played Kane and directed cut-scenes)
 Command & Conquer: Red Alert (1996), Westwood Studios (played Kane and directed cut-scenes)
 Lands of Lore II: Guardians of Destiny (1997), Avalon Interactive (directed cut-scenes)
 Blade Runner (1997), Virgin Interactive (voiced Crazylegs Larry, wrote the script and directed voice-over)
 Dune 2000 (1998), Westwood Studios (directed cut-scenes)
 Command & Conquer: Red Alert - Retaliation (1999), Westwood Studios (directed cut-scenes)
 Command & Conquer: Tiberian Sun (1999), Westwood Studios - EA Games (played Kane and directed cut-scenes)
 Nox (2000), Westwood Pacific (directed voice-over)
 Command & Conquer: Firestorm (2000), Westwood Studios - EA Games (played Kane and directed cut-scenes)
 Command & Conquer: Red Alert 2 (2000), Westwood Studios - EA Games (directed cut-scenes)
 Command & Conquer: Yuri's Revenge (2001), Westwood Studios - EA Games (directed cut-scenes)
 Emperor: Battle for Dune (2001), Westwood Studios - EA Games (directed cut-scenes)
 Command & Conquer: Renegade (2002), Westwood Studios - EA Games (voiced Kane and directed cut-scenes)
 Pirates: The Legend of Black Kat (2002), Westwood Studios
 Command & Conquer 3: Tiberium Wars (2007), EA Los Angeles (played Kane)
 Command & Conquer 3: Kane's Wrath (2008), EA Los Angeles (played Kane)
 Command & Conquer 4: Tiberian Twilight (2010), EA Los Angeles (played Kane)
 Command & Conquer Remastered Collection (2020), Petroglyph Games

References

External links
 
 

Living people
American male film actors
American male video game actors
Place of birth missing (living people)
Year of birth missing (living people)
American male voice actors
American casting directors
Westwood Studios